Jacob Stepanovich Esipov (died 1805) was a Russian inventor. In 1799-1801 he developed a technology for obtaining sugar from sugar beets under industrial conditions in Russia.

Commercialization
In November 1802, Esipov built the first beet sugar and alcohol distillery in Russia, in partnership with Yegor Ivanovich Blankennagel in the village of Alyabyevo of Chernovsky County of the Tula Governorate. 

During 1802-1803 the factory produced 4.9 tons of raw sugar from beets harvested from 11 tithe of crops (1 tithe = 1.09 ha). The purity was approximately 85%. Waste sugar production (molasses, etc.) was processed into ethyl alcohol. In 1807, the sugar-refining department was added to the plant. For the first time in Russia Esipov introduced the purification of beet juice with lime. This method is still used.

In the fall of 1802 Esipov built a second, more advanced beet sugar plant in the village of Nikolskoe. In 1803-1804, it produced raw and white sugar, alcohol, and liquor. Byproducts were was used for animal feed. The yield of raw sugar from beet was 3.1% of the beet mass. He died in St. Petersburg, Russia.

References

Year of birth missing
1805 deaths
Russian inventors
18th-century businesspeople from the Russian Empire
People from Tula Governorate